Patrice Noukeu (born November 22, 1982 in Douala) is a Cameroonian footballer who currently plays for under contract for Belgian side Izegem.

Noukeu has spent the majority of his professional career playing in Belgium teams, with spells in Greece and Azerbaijan for Skoda Xanthi F.C. and Kəpəz.

References

External links
 
 

1982 births
Living people
Cameroonian footballers
Cameroonian expatriate footballers
K.A.A. Gent players
Royal Excel Mouscron players
K.V. Mechelen players
Xanthi F.C. players
Association football midfielders
Belgian Pro League players
Super League Greece players
Expatriate footballers in Greece
Expatriate footballers in Belgium
Expatriate footballers in Azerbaijan
Cameroonian expatriate sportspeople in Azerbaijan